The Moment is the first compilation album by Singaporean singer Stefanie Sun, released on 22 August 2003 by Warner Music Taiwan. The album contains seven new songs and fifteen songs from her previous albums. The song "Encounter" is the theme song of 2003 joint Hong Kong-Singaporean film Turn Left, Turn Right. The album earned an IFPI Hong Kong Top Sales Music Award for Top 10 Best Selling Mandarin Albums of the Year in 2003.

Track listing
CD 1
 "The Moment"
 "遇見" (Encounter)
 "懶得去管" (Does Not Bother)
 "不能和你一起" (Can't Be with You)
 "太陽底下" (Under the Sun)
 "全心全意" (One United People)
 "One United People"
CD 2
 "我要的幸福" (My Desired Happiness)
 "超快感" (Turbo)
 "天黑黑" (Cloudy Day)
 "很好" (Fine)
 "Someone"
 "風筝" (Kite)
 "任性" (Abandon)
 "逃亡" (Abscondence)
 "害怕" (Fear)
 "永遠" (Forever)
 "眼神" (Wink)
 "橄欖樹" (Olive Tree)
 "沒有人的方向" (A Direction Without Anyone)
 "真的" (Really)
 "Tonight, I Feel Close to You"

References

2003 compilation albums
Stefanie Sun albums
Warner Music Taiwan compilation albums